Mereoni Vonosere Namositava is a Fijian rugby union player. She plays as a Tighthead Prop for Fiji.

Rugby career 
Vonosere was selected in Fiji's squad for the 2022 Oceania Championship in New Zealand. She scored a try in the 152–0 trouncing of Papua New Guinea. She also scored a try in Fijiana's 31–24 victory against Samoa.

In September 2022, She played in a warm up match against Canada. She was also named in the Fijiana squad for the 2021 Rugby World Cup.

References 

Year of birth missing (living people)
Living people
Female rugby union players
Fijian female rugby union players
Fiji women's international rugby union players